Brandon Massey (born June 9, 1973) is an American writer of thriller fiction, specializing in the horror and suspense genres. He is the author of several published novels, short story collections, and is the editor of three anthologies. Massey lives with his family near Atlanta, Georgia. He is a winner of the Gold Pen Award for Best Thriller from the Black Writers Alliance.

Early life
Massey was born in Waukegan, Illinois, and grew up in Zion, a suburb north of Chicago.

Work 
Many of Massey's works are set in and around Atlanta, Georgia and in the Deep South. His novels frequently incorporate elements of horror, suspense, and the supernatural. Massey's stories involve contemporary African-American life in both urban and southern gothic settings.

Publishing 
Several of Massey's earliest novels were published by Kensington Books under its Dafina imprint. His subsequent works have been published by Dark Corner Publishing, his own independent publishing company based in Atlanta.

Bibliography
Thunderland (1999)
Dark Corner (2004)
Dark Dreams (As Editor) (2004)
Within the Shadows (2005)
Dark Dreams II: Voices From the Other Side (As Editor) (2006)
Twisted Tales (2006)
The Other Brother (2006)
Vicious (2006)
Dark Dreams III: Whispers in the Night (As Editor) (2006)
The Last Affair (2007)  (written under the pen name Rachee)
Don't Ever Tell (2008)
The Ancestors (2009)  (Collection of African-American horror short stories by Brandon Massey, Tananarive Due, and L.A. Banks)
Covenant (2010)
Darker The Night: Collection (2011)
Darkness To Come (2013)
In The Dark (2014)
Frenzied (2017)
Nana (2018)
The Quiet Ones (2020)
No Stone Unturned (2022)

References

External links
 Brandon Massey's website
 www.brandonmassey.com/books/

1973 births
American thriller writers
African-American novelists
Living people
American male novelists
20th-century American novelists
21st-century American novelists
American male short story writers
People from Waukegan, Illinois
Novelists from Illinois
20th-century American short story writers
21st-century American short story writers
20th-century American male writers
21st-century American male writers
American horror novelists
20th-century African-American writers
21st-century African-American writers
African-American male writers